Leslie Hill is professor of French at the University of Warwick. He has written several influential books on French writers and philosophers including Samuel Beckett, Marguerite Duras, Maurice Blanchot, Georges Bataille, Pierre Klossowski and Jacques Derrida. Hill was elected to a fellowship of the British Academy in 2003.

Book publications
 Blanchot politique: Sur une reflexion jamais interrompue (Geneva: Éditions Furor, 2020)
 Nancy, Blanchot: A Serious Controversy (London, Rowman & Littlefield, 2018)
 Maurice Blanchot and Fragmentary Writing: A Change of Epoch (London, Continuum, 2012)
 Radical Indecision: Barthes, Blanchot, Derrida, and the Future of Criticism (Notre Dame, University of Notre Dame Press, 2010)
 The Cambridge Introduction to Jacques Derrida (Cambridge, Cambridge University Press, 2007)
 Bataille, Klossowski, Blanchot: Writing at the Limit (Oxford, Oxford University Press, 2001)
 Blanchot: Extreme Contemporary (London, Routledge, 1997)
 Marguerite Duras: Apocalyptic Desires (London, Routledge, 1993)
 Beckett's Fiction: In Different Words (Cambridge, Cambridge University Press, 1990)

External links
 Research Profile

References

Academics of the University of Warwick
English literary critics
Literary critics of French
1949 births
Living people
Alumni of Gonville and Caius College, Cambridge
Fellows of the British Academy